Moylisker is a civil parish in County Westmeath, Ireland.

Moylisker is one of 10 civil parishes in the barony of Fartullagh in the Province of Leinster.

Moylisker civil parish comprises 8 townlands: Anneville  Rathduff, Belvidere, Dunboden Demesne, Paslicktown, Prebaun, Rathduff a.k.a. Anneville, Rochfort Demesne, Tallyho and Tyrrellstown.

The neighbouring civil parishes are: Lynn to the north, Enniscoffey to the east and Carrick and Kilbride to the south.

References

External links
Moylisker civil parish at the IreAtlas Townland Data Base
Moylisker civil parish at townlands.ie
Moylisker civil parish at the Placenames Database of Ireland

Civil parishes of County Westmeath